Riverdale South is an electoral district which elects a Member of the Legislative Assembly (MLA) to the Legislative Assembly of the Yukon Territory in Canada. Along with Riverdale North, it makes up the subdivision of Whitehorse called Riverdale. It is bordered by the ridings of Riverdale North, Mountainview, Copperbelt South, and Mount Lorne-Southern Lakes.

MLAs

Election history

2021 general election

2016 general election

|-

| Liberal
| Tracy McPhee
| align="right"| 421
| align="right"| 37.2%
| align="right"| +8.9%
|-

| NDP
| Jan Stick
| align="right"| 384
| align="right"| 34.0%
| align="right"| -5.2%

|-
! align=left colspan=3|Total
! align=right| 1128
! align=right| 100.0%
! align=right| –
|}

2011 general election

|-

| NDP
| Jan Stick
| align="right"| 380
| align="right"| 39.2%
| align="right"| +18.7%

| Liberal
| Dan Curtis
| align="right"| 275
| align="right"| 28.3%
| align="right"| -9.5%
|-
! align=left colspan=3|Total
! align=right| 969
! align=right| 100.0%
! align=right| –
|}

2006 general election

|-

| Liberal
| Phil Treusch
| align="right"|324
| align="right"|37.8%
| align="right"|+3.6%

| NDP
| Peter Lesniak
| align="right"|176
| align="right"|20.5%
| align="right"|-5.6%
|-
! align=left colspan=3|Total
! align=right| 857
! align=right| 100.0%
! align=right| –
|}

2002 general election

|-

| Liberal
| Sue Edelman
| align="right"|332
| align="right"|34.2%
| align="right"|-14.7%

| NDP
| Cary Gryba
| align="right"|253
| align="right"|26.1%
| align="right"|-1.3%
|-
! align=left colspan=3|Total
! align=right| 970
! align=right| 100.0%
! align=right| –
|}

2000 general election

|-

| Liberal
| Sue Edelman
| align="right"| 422
| align="right"| 48.9%
| align="right"| -8.8%

| NDP
| Heather Finton
| align="right"| 237
| align="right"| 27.4%
| align="right"| +27.4%

|-
! align=left colspan=3|Total
! align=right|864
! align=right|100.0%
! align=right|
|}

1996 general election

|-

| Liberal
| Sue Edelman
| align="right"|476
| align="right"|57.7%
| align="right"|+52.7%

|-
! align=left colspan=3|Total
! align=right|825
! align=right|100.0%
! align=right| –
|}

1992 general election

|-
} 
|Independent
|Bea Firth
|align="right"| 384
|align="right"| 39.7%
|align="right"| –

|NDP
|Maurice Byblow
|align="right"| 242
|align="right"| 25.0%
|align="right"| –

|Liberal
|Paul Thériault
|align="right"| 48
|align="right"| 5.0%
|align="right"| –
|- bgcolor="white"
!align="left" colspan=3|Total
!align="right"|967
!align="right"|100.0%
!align="right"|–

References

Yukon territorial electoral districts
Politics of Whitehorse
1978 establishments in Yukon